Sagrera railway station is a major through station under construction in the Barcelona districts of Sant Andreu and Sant Martí, in Catalonia, Spain. It is intended to serve as the central station for northern and eastern Barcelona, with Sants serving as the central station for southern and western Barcelona. It will also be on the conventional Barcelona–Cerbère and Barcelona–Mataró–Maçanet-Massanes railways. Once fully completed, it will be a major public transport hub, with dedicated stations on Barcelona Metro lines 4 and 9/10, as well as a bus station. The complex will be fully underground excepting for the station building, with two levels of platforms, accounting for a total of 18 railway tracks. 

The new station is part of a larger urban redevelopment project along the corridor formed by the railways accessing Barcelona from the north-east, which divides the districts of Sant Andreu and Sant Martí. This project includes the rebuilding of Sant Andreu Comtal railway station, to the north of Sagrera, and the construction of a  linear artificial park over the railways running on the corridor, which will be put underground. At an estimated cost of €2 billion, the project is funded and managed by Barcelona Sagrera Alta Velocitat (BSAV), a public partnership made up of the Spanish Ministry of Public Works and Transport, the Government of Catalonia and the Barcelona City Council.

The idea of a new central station at this location has appeared on local transport projects since the late 1960s. Before being demolished in 2007 with the start of the previous works to the construction of the new station, a major goods station on the Barcelona–Cerbère railway, built between 1918 and 1922, had operated at the location. The groundbreaking ceremony for the new station took place on 21 June 2010, when the completion date was set for 2016. In July 2011, a  Roman villa was found due to the station construction works. The Spanish Ministry of Public Works and Transport and the City Council announced in July 2013 that they had reached an agreement to modify the original project in order to reduce its cost. In June 2016, it was disclosed that the station works have remained suspended since early 2014 due to a corruption scandal involving one of the companies carrying out the works. After the works were resumed, the new station is now expected to open to AVE and local trains by 2028.

Barcelona Metro stations

The future Sagrera railway station will be served by lines 4 and 9/10 of the Barcelona Metro. The metro stations will be located parallel to each other, sharing the same hall, on the Sant Andreu district side, to the north-west of the station building. They will be almost level with the lower level of platforms, which will be served by Rodalies de Catalunya commuter and regional rail services.

See also
 Madrid–Barcelona high-speed rail line
 Sants railway station
 Sant Andreu Comtal railway station
 La Sagrera-Meridiana station
 Sagrera Tower

References

Bibliography

External links

 Barcelona Sagrera Alta Velocitat 
 Information and photos of the future station at trenscat.cat 
 Esto va de obras on WordPress. A personal blog following the development of the construction works of the station and its surroundings. 

Madrid–Barcelona high-speed rail line
Railway stations in Barcelona
Rodalies de Catalunya stations
Barcelona Metro line 4 stations
Barcelona Metro line 9 stations
Proposed Barcelona Metro stations
Transport in Sant Andreu
Transport in Sant Martí (district)
Rail transport in Barcelona
Railway stations located underground in Spain